Blaze Records was a record label founded by former Atlantic Records president Herb Abramson.  The label's biggest hit was a version of "Tennessee Waltz" by Bobby Comstock in 1959.  The label lasted only a couple of years after which Abramson founded Festival Records.

References

American record labels
Defunct companies based in New York City